zero visibility corp. is a contemporary dance company based in Oslo, Norway which was founded in 1996 by its choreographer Ina Christel Johannessen and lighting and set designer, Jens Sethzman. Their productions are developed from improvisation with a stylistic approach that has overtones of martial arts and acrobatics, between art-dance and pop-dance, "pure dance" and theatrical dance, humorous and serious dance. 

With its particular choreographic style, their work is based on films, literature and news stories which combine to generate an intentional ambivalence about diverse themes, creating material in close dialogue with everyone involved. Zero Visibility works with artist within experimental electronic music. 
The company has toured its work internationally, in Europe, Australia, the United States, and Canada and has become one of Norway's most internationally recognised dance companies. Their work has been featured in several notable arts and contemporary dance festivals, including the Edinburgh Festival Fringe, Scotland; NOTT Dance, UK; Fierce!, UK; and euro-scene, Germany.

Productions

1997 ...except that I would like to be rid of it...
1998 what do we do now that we're happy
1999 hunt out [reprise]
2000 Suppose this time I see what he saw
2001 confession time: that cool and immature feeling of total honesty
2002 mic mac
2003 ...it's only a rehearsal - An adaptation of Ovid's Metamorphoses.
2004 The Terror Of Identification
2006 (but) that night I found her very alluring
2006 I have a secret to tell you (please) leave with me
2008 37,7
2008 It was November
2009 THIEF – AFTER – Clip 0 (zero)
2010 NOW SHE KNOWS
2011 (im)possible
2012 Again
2012 Leave.Two.House
2014 Terra 0 Motel
2015 Piano Piano
2015 The Guest
2016 Future
2017 Frozen Songs
2018 Who told you this room exists?
2019 Il Lunedi
2020 When Monday Came

References

External links
 

Contemporary dance companies
Performing arts in Norway
Culture in Oslo